The Volkswagen Golf Mk6 (code named Typ 5K) is a compact car, the sixth generation of the Volkswagen Golf and the successor to the Volkswagen Golf Mk5. It was unveiled at the Paris Motor Show in October 2008 for the 2009 model year. Volkswagen released pictures and information on August 6, 2008, prior to the official unveiling. The vehicle was released to the European market in the winter of 2008. Volkswagen claimed investments were made in production efficiency, with a claimed productivity improvement at launch of nearly 20% in comparison with the previous model, with further gains planned for the first twelve months of production.

Although billed as the Mk6, the new model was largely based on its predecessor, the Golf Mk5, and was effectively a re-engineered facelift of the previous model. In January 2013, it was superseded by the Volkswagen Golf Mk7, which was built on the newly assembled MQB platform.

Design
Like its predecessor, the Mk6 Golf is based on the Volkswagen Group A5 (PQ35) platform. It is effectively a reskin of the Mk5 rather than an all-new design; it was developed with engineering improvements to shorten the previous model's assembly time to save costs. Additionally, it answered criticisms of that model's cheapened interior quality compared to that of the Mk4 and Mk3 Golf.

Specifications

Equipment
Improvements in equipment level on the domestic market Golfs include—for the first time in a Golf—air conditioning as standard.
Additionally, dual-zone climate control is included in the Autobahn trim for North America.

Engines

The company spoke confidently of launching a BlueMotion low emissions Golf in Germany, back in 2009. They've also mentioned utilizing alternative fuels in later products.

Available engines for North American Golf include the 2.5 L I5 engine from the previous Mk5 Rabbit and Mk5 Jetta and the 2.0-litre TDI. GTI version features the 2.0-litre TSI.

Safety
With safety features such as seven standard airbags (up to nine in Europe, up to eight in the US) and standard Electronic Stability Programme (ESP), the Golf Mk6 has scored 36 out of 37 possible points for occupant protection, giving it a five-star rating by the Euro NCAP crash test agency. It was one of the safest vehicles in its class at the time of its release.

Models

Cabriolet

The Volkswagen Golf Cabriolet was presented at the 2011 Geneva International Motor Show. The four-seater has a soft top with an electro-hydraulic drive that opens the Golf's top in 9.5 seconds. After nine years without a convertible Golf, it was the first Cabriolet model under the Golf family since 2002.

The VW Golf Cabriolet's styling follows that of its hard-top three-door counterpart, but it differs somewhat with a rear section, lower profile roofline and more swept-back angle of its front windscreen frame. Bi-xenon headlights are an option. Unlike the regular Golf, the Cabriolet has LED rear lights, which are only available for the R and GTI versions of the hardtop. Safety features include the automatically deploying roll-over bar, front airbags, side head/thorax airbags, knee airbag for the driver and ESP.

Four of the petrol engines (TSI) and one diesel (TDI) are available with the DSG dual-clutch gearbox; while three of the engines are available with energy-saving BlueMotion Technology.

In February 2012, Volkswagen announced that they would build a Cabriolet version of the GTI, powered by a 2.0-liter four-cylinder engine.

As of October 2016, VW announced that the Golf cabriolet will no longer be sold in the UK due to financial reasons.

Station wagon
A facelifted variant Mk5 Golf Variant model was introduced in 2009 as the Mk6, despite carrying the front fascia, interior styling, and the powertrain from the new Golf, the body shell and underpinnings are based on its fifth-generation predecessor. It is sold in the US as the Jetta SportWagen, in Mexico and Canada as the Golf Wagon and in South America as the Jetta Variant or Vento Variant.

Golf Plus

In December 2008, a face-lifted version of the Golf Plus was revealed at the Bologna Motor Show, featuring a revised front end, similar to the Golf Mk6, but still largely retaining the design of the rear end and the interior of the Mk5 based vehicle. In 2014, the Golf Plus was replaced by the MQB-based Golf Sportsvan, which was originally shown as the Sportsvan concept.

Twin Drive

Volkswagen CEO Martin Winterkorn announced Golf Twin Drive plug-in hybrid concept based on Mk5 Golf, which uses 2.0 L  I4 turbodiesel and  electric motor with lithium-ion batteries. The car can run about 50 kilometres on battery power.

Volkswagen developed the Twin Drive system with eight German partners, and is planning a trial fleet of 20 Golfs outfitted with the system in 2010.

The production version was expected to be based on new Mk6 Golf, featuring a 1.5 L turbodiesel engine and electric motor, with estimated arrival date of 2015.

Golf GTI "Wörthersee 09" (2009)
The Golf GTI "Wörthersee 09" is a concept car based on the Golf GTI. 2.0-liter TSI. It features a Firespark Metallic red body color with GTI stripes, high-gloss black 19-inch alloy spoke wheels, smoked LED taillights, a lowered chassis and a new sport exhaust. Changes to the interior include aluminum tread plates, brushed aluminum trim and glossy black painted frames around the air vents, red bordered floor mats and black Nappa leather sport seats with red accents and "Berry White" leather piping.

The vehicle was unveiled at the Wörthersee GTi-Treffen meet in Wörthersee, Austria.

Golf R 

There was much speculation about this vehicle, with uncertainty surrounding its name. Golf R20 was the most common name used prior to the Frankfurt Motor Show. Once finally unveiled by Volkswagen at the Frankfurt IAA on 15 September 2009, it was confirmed the R32 replacement would simply be called the Golf R.

VW claims the car can get from 0– in 5.5 seconds for DSG equipped models, or 5.7 seconds for cars fitted with a manual transmission. It employs a revised (5th-generation) Haldex 4motion all-wheel drive system.

A Canadian version was announced for early 2012, but only as a four-door version with six-speed manual transmission.

Special editions

GTI Edition 35

Following Volkswagen's 30th anniversary edition GTI, the 35th anniversary was celebrated with the GTI Edition 35. Its engine was an updated version of the Mk5 GTI engine (also used in the Mk6 Golf R), with 232 bhp (compared to 266 for the R). Acceleration from 0-62 mph is in 6.6 seconds.

International markets

In the United States and Canada, the car was sold as the Volkswagen Golf when it arrived in showrooms in October 2009, dropping the "Rabbit" badge that was used for the Golf Mk5. The wagon, a restyled version of the Mk5 and the only Golf model made in Mexico, is sold in Canada as "Golf Wagon", but in the United States retains the "Jetta SportWagen" designation (while wearing Golf front sheetmetal). North American Golfs will carry over the same engines as the Mk5 (the same 2.5L five-cylinder from the Mk5, the 2.0TDI and the 2.0T) and, while the GTI and TDI continue to offer the six-speed manual transmission, the 2.5 L will re-use the five-speed manual (automatic will be a six-speed tiptronic). The new Golf is also available in Mexico but for the time being only in the wagon configuration that is marketed as Golf SportWagen that became available in early October replacing the Bora Sportwagen with the new Golf's front end.

The Australian public got their first taste of the new Mk6 at the Melbourne International Motor Show, which began on 27 February 2009. The new Golf was launched around the country at the same time. The Mk6 GTI went on sale from 30 October 2009. On 19 January 2010 the Golf was awarded the 2009 Wheels Car of the Year title, which is acknowledged as the country's most prestigious car award. It was the first time the Golf had been awarded the title since 1976. VW Australia launched the new base model golf with 1.2-litre engine same as the new Polo in September 2010 and went on sale in 2011.

In South Africa the new Mk6 Golf went on sale in April 2009. The South African version of the GTI went on sale in July 2009.

In Japan the new Mk6 Golf went on sale in April 2009. The Japanese version of the GTI went on sale in August 2009.

In China, the Golf Mk6 was made by FAW-VW commencing production for the 2009 model year, succeeding the Mk4 Golf and China-exclusive Bora HS as the Mk5 variant was not produced in China. The sixth generation GTI began to be built locally for first time in March 2010 and used a different engine compared to Golf GTI model sold internationally, where a 2-litre TSI unit producing  was available as standard,  less than the original one. This engine is also used by the VW Magotan. The 5 speed manual and 7 speed dual clutch gearbox was standard on TSI models while the 1.6 litre units were paired to a 5 speed manual and 6 speed automatic gearbox. Pricing for the 1.4 TSI ranged between 135,800 and 166,800 yuan with three trims ($20,820 to $25,575 US - April 2021 exchange rate), 118,800 yuan to 156,800 yuan with five trims for the 1.6 ($18,215 to $24,040 US - April 2021 exchange rate) and 235,800 yuan ($36,154 US - April 2021 exchange rate) for the Golf GTI model. Production for this generation ended in 2013, where it was replaced the Golf Mk7.

In Mexico, the only two versions available until August 2011 were the German-imported 3-door GTI in both 6-speed manual and 6-speed DSG transmissions, and the Mexican-produced Golf SportWagen with a 170 bhp 2.5 L inline 5-cylinder with a 6-speed Tiptronic transmission. In September 2012, a 5-door version in Comfortline trim, with 1.4 L TSI engine with 177 hp and 6-speed manual gearbox imported from Germany was added. Since the end of production is imminent, it will be limited to 4,000 units.

In Chile, the Golf Mk6 was presented in October 2010 at the XI Salón del Automóvil de Santiago, starting sales immediately. Chile is the first country in South America to sell the Mk6, as a restyled version of the Mk4 is still in production in Brazil for Latin America. The Mk6 is available in Chile with the 1.6 L Petrol engine (101 hp) both in five-speed manual and seven-speed DSG transmissions.

In India, the Golf Mk6 was rumored to be introduced in 2011 but in a recent interview, Volkswagen Chief Executive Officer said that the plans for introducing a Golf have been suspended, to preserve the success of VW Vento in the Indian market. The Golf, if released, would be similarly priced as the Vento and VW does not want Vento sales to slip. He also stated they may bring in a more localized Golf with the same engine choices as the Vento when numbers stabilize in the near future.

Motorsport
In auto racing, APR Motorsport has led two MKVI VW GTIs to victory in the Grand-Am Continental Tire Sports Car Challenge Street Tuner (ST) class.

To commemorate the 35th Anniversary of the Golf GTI, Volkswagen Motorsport entered the 2011 24 Hours Nürburgring with the "Golf24". This Golf was equipped with a
In the third VLN race of 2011, the Golf24 finished sixth overall, with its best lap only nine seconds slower than the fastest race lap, which was clocked by a Ferrari 458. For the 24 Hours, the team hoped for rain, and jokingly considered wetting the track by aerial firefighting. Eventually, though, neither of the three Golf24s finished the race, with one of them suffering a pit-entry accident and another blowing a gearbox. When the gearbox of the remaining Golf24 started overheating, VW decided to retire it to find out the cause of the gearbox trouble.

Awards
 2009 World Car of the Year
 2009 Euro NCAP – Safest Car of the Year
 2009 Best Performance Car under $60,000 (GTI) (Australia)
 2009 Yellow Angel (Germany)
 2009 Auto Motor and Sport Readers' Best Car (Germany)
 2009 Wheels Car of the Year (Australia)
 2009 What Car? – Best Small Family Car (Great Britain)
 2009 International Engine of the Year (1.4 TSI) 
 2009 Green Engine of the Year (1.4 TSI) 
 2009–10 Japan's Import Car of the Year
 2010 Continental Irish Car of the Year – Best Family Car.
 2010 Automobile Magazine – Car of the Year (GTI) 
 2010 Canadian Car of the Year
 2010 What Car? – Best Small Family Car (Great Britain)
 2010 South African Car of the Year 
 2010 Fleet News – Company Car of the Year 
 2010 World Green Car (BlueMotion) 
 Kelley Blue Book included the VW Golf TDI (clean diesel) among its Top 10 Green Cars for 2010.
 2010 Top Gear Magazine – Hot Hatch of the year (Golf R)
 2011 What Car? – Best Small Family Car (Great Britain)
 2012 What Car? – Best Small Family Car (Great Britain)

References

External links

All-wheel-drive vehicles
Compact cars
Euro NCAP small family cars
Flexible-fuel vehicles
Front-wheel-drive vehicles
Hot hatches
Station wagons
Cars introduced in 2008
Golf 6
2010s cars